The Helmuth-James-von-Moltke-Preis was established in 2001 by the German Section of the International Society for Military Law and the Law of War. It is awarded every two years for outstanding judicial works in the field of security policy. 

The prize is named after the German jurist Helmuth von Moltke (1907-1945), involved in the 20 July Plot.

Recipients 
 2001 - Peter Hilpold, Birgit Kessler
 2003 - Andreas Hasenclever
 2005 - Heike Krieger, Detlev Wolter 
 2007 - Heiko Meiertöns
 2009 - Katharina Ziolkowski
 2011 - Daniel Heck, Jana Hertwig

External links 
 International Society for Military Law and the Law of War
 German Society for Military Law and the Law of War 

Military justice
German awards
Legal awards
Awards established in 2001